Independente may refer to:

Independente Atlético Clube (PA), Brazilian football men's and women's club from Tucuruí, Pará
Independente Esporte Clube, Brazilian football club from Santana, Amapá
Independente Futebol Clube, Brazilian football club from Limeira, São Paulo
Independente University, former Portuguese private university from Lisbon
O Independente, former Portuguese weekly newspaper
Televisão Independente, Portuguese terrestrial television
Sociedade Independente de Comunicação, Portuguese television network and media company
GRES Mocidade Independente de Padre Miguel, Brazilian samba school from Rio de Janeiro city
Serra Macaense Futebol Clube (founded as Independente Esportes Clube Macaé), Brazilian football club from Macaé, Rio de Janeiro
Palmeiras Nordeste Futebol (founded as Associação Atlética Independente), former Brazilian football club from Feira de Santana, Bahia

See also
Independent (disambiguation)